Citrus bergamia, the bergamot orange (pronounced ), is a fragrant citrus fruit the size of an orange, with a yellow or green color similar to a lime, depending on ripeness.

Genetic research into the ancestral origins of extant citrus cultivars found bergamot orange to be a probable hybrid of lemon and bitter orange. Extracts have been used as an aromatic ingredient in food, tea, snus, perfumes, and cosmetics. Use on the skin can increase photosensitivity, resulting in greater damage from sun exposure.

Etymology
The word bergamot is derived from the Italian word , derived either from the Italian town of Bergamo or Ottoman Turkish  ("prince's pear").

Description
Citrus bergamia is a small tree that blossoms during the winter. The juice tastes less sour than lemon, but more bitter than grapefruit.

Phytochemicals
Bergamot fruit or oil contains flavonoids, such as neoeriocitrin, naringin, neohesperidin, melitidin, neoeriocitrin , brutieridin, and bergamottin. Bergamot leaves contain different indole alkaloids, such as N,N,N-trimethyltryptamine.

Taxonomy

The bergamot orange is unrelated to the herbs known as bergamot, wild bergamot, bergamot mint, or bergamint – Monarda didyma, M. fistulosa, and Eau de Cologne mint (Mentha, disputed species). Those are all in the mint family, and are named for their similar aroma.

Citrus bergamia has also been classified as C. aurantium subsp. bergamia (i.e. a subspecies of bitter orange).

C. bergamia is sometimes confused with C. medica (the citron, the yellow fruit of which is also known as etrog), and with C. limetta, the "sweet lemon" or "sweet lime".

Production

The bergamot is a citrus fruit native to southern Italy. Production is mostly limited to the Ionian Sea coastal areas of the province of Reggio di Calabria in Italy, to such an extent that it is a symbol of the entire city. Most of the bergamot comes from a short stretch of land there, where the temperature is favourable. The fruit is also produced in Argentina, Brazil, Algeria, the Ivory Coast, Morocco, Tunisia, Turkey, and South-East Asia.

It is also grown in southern France and the Ivory Coast for the essential oil and in Antalya in southern Turkey for its marmalade. The fruit is not generally grown for juice consumption. However, in Mauritius where it is grown on a small-scale basis, it is largely consumed as juice by the locals.

Adulteration with cheaper products such as oil of rosewood and bergamot mint has been a problem for consumers. To protect the reputation of their produce, the Italian government introduced tight controls, including testing and certificates of purity. The Stazione Sperimentale per le Industrie delle Essenze e dei Derivati dagli Agrumi (Experimental Station for Essential Oil and Citrus By-Products) located in Reggio di Calabria, is the quality control body for the essential oil Bergamotto di Reggio Calabria DOP.

During World War II, Italy was unable to export to countries such as the Allied powers. Rival products from Brazil and Mexico came on to the market as a substitute, but these were produced from other citrus fruits such as sweet lime.

Uses

Tea and other uses

An essence extracted from the aromatic skin of this sour fruit is used to flavour Earl Grey and Lady Grey teas, as well as confectionery (including Turkish delight).  Bergamot is one of the most common "casings" (flavorings) added to Swedish snus, a form of smokeless tobacco product.

Fragrance

Bergamot oil is one of the most commonly used ingredients in perfumery. It is prized for its ability to combine with an array of scents to form a bouquet of aromas that complement each other. Bergamot is a major component of the original  composed by Jean-Marie Farina at the beginning of the 18th century in Germany. The first use of bergamot oil as a fragrance ingredient was recorded in 1714, and can be found in the Farina Archive in Cologne.  However, much "Bergamot oil" is today derived instead from eau de Cologne mint, also known as bergamot mint, which is a variety of water mint and is unrelated to citrus.

Toxicology

In several patch test studies, application of some sources of bergamot oil directly to the skin of guinea pigs was shown to have a concentration-dependent phototoxic effect of increasing redness after exposure to ultraviolet light (due to the chemical bergapten, and possibly also citropten, bergamottin, geranial, and neral). This is a property shared by many other citrus fruits and other members of Rutaceae, including rue.

Skin effects

Used in cosmetics and perfume products, bergamot may cause skin irritation. In the past, psoralen extracted from bergamot oil was used in tanning accelerators and sunscreens. Known to be photocarcinogenic since 1959, the substances nonetheless were used in tanning activators until 1995, contributing to many cases of melanoma and death.

Research

As of 2017, clinical research conducted on bergamot oil has been of poor quality, with no conclusions about its possible biological effects. Consuming bergamot oil as a component of tea may cause muscle cramps. Use on the skin may be unsafe, particularly for children and pregnant women, and may cause rashes resulting from photodermatotoxicity.

References

External links

 Bergamot by Citrus Variety Collection of the UCR
 Citrus bergamia on Wikispecies
 BBC news story on the farming of Bergamot in the Calabria region of Italy
 Information about the hard candy bergamote de Nancy

Calabria
Citrus hybrids
Flora of Greece
Flora of Iran
Citrus
Oranges (fruit)
Ark of Taste foods